The Zlatibor Corps was a corps of the Yugoslav Army in the Homeland (JVuO) centered on the Zlatibor mountain in southwestern Serbia. It was commanded by captain Dušan Radović "Kondor".

References

Sources

External links

Military units and formations of the Chetniks in World War II